In the three centuries starting with the reign of Ashur-dan II (934-912 BCE), the Neo-Assyrian Empire practiced a policy of resettlement (also called "deportation" or "mass deportation") of population groups in its territories. The majority of the resettlements were done with careful planning by the government in order to strengthen the empire. For example, a population might have been moved around to spread agricultural techniques or develop new lands. It could have also been done as punishment for political enemies, as an alternative to execution. In other cases, the selected elites of a conquered territory were moved to the Assyrian empire to enrich and increase the knowledge in the empire's centre.

Bustenay Oded estimated in 1979 that about 4.4 million people (± 900,000) were relocated over a 250-year period. One instance, the relocation of the Israelites in the late eighth century BCE was described in Biblical passages and came to be known as the Assyrian captivity.

Types 
Forced deportation and subsequent resettlement were used as tools of political domination and subjugation to maintain control over conquered people groups. Large population groups were systematically transferred between different regions within the empire to strengthen their political unity or put down possible rebellions. Imperial administrators planned the population transfers, taking into account political, economic, and cultural considerations. For example, people might have been moved to develop new lands. In 720 BCE Sargon II resettled 6,300 Assyrians who were involved in a power struggle against him from the heartland of the empire to the newly conquered city of Hamat (modern Hama, Syria). By ordering resettlement instead of execution of his enemies, the king displayed his mercy, political threats were removed from the empire's center, and the deportees were also beneficial in the reconstruction of the war-torn city.

In other cases, Assyria also relocated people from newly conquered territories to its heartland. Typically, the elite section of the population was selected in a careful process. This group included highly skilled people: craftsmen, scholars and cultural elites, whose resettlement in the empire's heartland would bring knowledge and wealth. The empire's capitals, Nineveh, Kalhu and Assur were well-populated with people from throughout the empire, who were instrumental in the building of Assyria's lasting monuments, including the famous Royal Library of Ashurbanipal.

Logistics 
The Assyrian state supervised and planned the move to be as efficient as possible. The deportees were meant to arrive intact, ready to be placed work and resettle in their new environment. Some surviving Assyrian art depicts deportees traveling with their family and possessions with beasts of burden in tow, while other pieces depict the displaced peoples marching while shackled or tied up, or while being pulled along with hooks placed in their cheeks or noses. Ride animals were used, as well as boxes and vessels to carry supplies needed for resettlement. State officials were directly involved, for example a letter from an official to Tiglath-pileser III showed that the official provided the "food supplies, clothes, a waterskin, [...] shoes and oil" and was waiting for donkeys to be available before sending a convoy of deportees.

Magnitude 
A 1979 estimate by Bustenay Oded—extrapolating based on written documents—estimated that 4.4 million people, plus or minus 900,000, were relocated over a 250-year period. 85% of them were resettled in the Assyrian heartland.

Status of deportees 
Surviving documents do not speak directly to the social and legal status of deportees, but historians attempted to infer them indirectly, especially from documents mentioning people with non-Assyrian names in Assyrian heartlands—presumably many of such people were deportees. The treatment of the deportees varied from case to case and it is hard to generalize, often those who were untrained were enslaved and put to work on massive building projects, while those who worked in various professions were placed to work according to their training. Those who worked in agriculture were assigned lands to work on, with a similar status to that of others within the empire. Many worked in high-skilled jobs, including as craftsmen, scholars, and merchants. The most educated and trained deportees were placed in royal service, and those willing to adopt the Assyrian identity and gods were able to join the Assyrian military. The state encouraged the mixing of deportees and native inhabitants where they lived in order to abolish their previous ethnic and religious identity in favor of a new shared "Assyrian" identity.

Biblical reference 

The resettlement of Israelites conquered by the Neo-Assyrian Empire were mentioned in the Old Testament, which came to be called the "Assyrian captivity". The Assyrian King Tiglath-Pileser III defeated an alliance which included King Pekah of Israel, occupied Northern Israel and then ordered a large number of Israelites to relocate to Assyria proper. Pekah's successor King Hoshea rebelled against Assyria in 724 BCE. King Shalmaneser V (Tiglath-Pileser's successor) besieged Samaria, which was finally captured in 722 BCE by Shalmaneser's successor Sargon II. After the fall of Samaria, 27,280 people (according to Assyrian records) were deported to various places throughout the empire, mainly to Guzana in the Assyrian heartland, as well as to the cities of the Medes in the eastern part of the empire (modern-day Iran). The cities of Medes were only conquered by Assyria in 716 BCE, six years after the fall of Samaria, suggesting that the relocation took years to plan before it was implemented. At the same time, people from other parts of the empire were resettled in the depopulated region.

See also
 Demographic engineering
 Divide and rule
 Land of Kir

References

Citations

Works cited

 
 
 
 

Neo-Assyrian Empire
Forced migration